"Grandpa Told Me So" is a song written by Mark Alan Springer and James Dean Hicks, and recorded by American country music artist Kenny Chesney. It was released in November 1995 as the third and final single from the album All I Need to Know.  The song reached number 23 on the Billboard Hot Country Singles & Tracks chart.

Chart performance
"Grandpa Told Me So" debuted at number 75 on the U.S. Billboard Hot Country Singles & Tracks for the week of November 6, 1995.

References

1995 singles
Kenny Chesney songs
Song recordings produced by Barry Beckett
Songs written by Mark Alan Springer
BNA Records singles
1995 songs
Songs written by James Dean Hicks